Calvin T. Samuel is a Barbados-born Methodist minister and theologian, working mostly in the UK. He has served as Director of the Wesley Study Centre at Durham University and Principal of the London School of Theology.

Samuel was born in Barbados. His father and mother were, respectively, a politician and teacher.  He grew up in both Antigua and Barbados in the Caribbean. His early career was in banking before he moved to the UK in 1993 to study for an undergraduate degree in Theology and Pastoral Studies at Nazarene Theological College, Manchester. He subsequently gained an MBA from Manchester Business School and completed a PhD at King's College London.

Initially a licensed minister of the Wesleyan Holiness Church, he was received into full connexion and ordained into the Methodist Church in 2001.  He was subsequently a member of Methodism’s Faith and Order Committee.

Career in Higher Education
Samuel was Assistant Director of Research and Faculty Administration at London Business School and a visiting lecturer in Biblical studies at Nazarene Theological College alongside his ministry. He was later appointed New Testament Tutor at Spurgeon's College, London.

He then became Director of the Wesley Study Centre, based at St John's College, Durham and was appointed Academic Dean of its Cranmer Hall ministerial training college.  In 2017 he was appointed Principal of the London School of Theology until February 2019 when, during an internal investigation into alleged misconduct, his resignation was accepted.

Publications and media
Samuel has published two books: 
 
 
From time to time he has also broadcast devotional items on BBC Radio 4 and Premier Christian Radio.

References 

Living people
Methodist ministers
Alumni of the University of Manchester
Alumni of King's College London
Staff of Cranmer Hall, Durham
Year of birth missing (living people)